Shoal Lake 34B2 is a First Nations reserve on the shores of Shoal Lake in northwestern Ontario. It is shared between the Iskatewizaagegan 39 Independent First Nation and Shoal Lake 40 First Nation.

References

Saulteaux reserves in Ontario
Communities in Kenora District